Betrothed numbers or quasi-amicable numbers are two positive integers such that the sum of the proper divisors of either number is one more than the value of the other number. In other words, (m, n) are a pair of betrothed numbers if s(m) = n + 1  and s(n) = m + 1, where s(n) is the aliquot sum of n: an equivalent condition is that σ(m) = σ(n) = m + n + 1, where σ denotes the sum-of-divisors function.

The first few pairs of betrothed numbers  are: (48, 75), (140, 195), (1050, 1925), (1575, 1648), (2024, 2295), (5775, 6128).

All known pairs of betrothed numbers have opposite parity.  Any pair of the same parity must exceed 1010.

Quasi-sociable numbers 
Quasi-sociable numbers or reduced sociable numbers are numbers whose aliquot sums minus one form a cyclic sequence that begins and ends with the same number. They are generalizations of the concepts of betrothed numbers and quasiperfect numbers. The first quasi-sociable sequences, or quasi-sociable chains, were discovered by Mitchell Dickerman in 1997:
 
 1215571544 = 2^3*11*13813313
 1270824975 = 3^2*5^2*7*19*42467
 1467511664 = 2^4*19*599*8059
 1530808335 = 3^3*5*7*1619903
 1579407344 = 2^4*31^2*59*1741
 1638031815 = 3^4*5*7*521*1109
 1727239544 = 2^3*2671*80833
 1512587175 = 3*5^2*11*1833439

References

External links
 

Arithmetic dynamics
Divisor function
Integer sequences